Alienable may refer to:
 in law, property that can be subject to alienation
 in grammar, a type of possession